Four Mile Creek is a rural locality in the local government area (LGA) of Break O'Day in the North-east LGA region of Tasmania. The 2016 census recorded a population of 96 for the state suburb of Four Mile Creek.

History 
Four Mile Creek is a confirmed locality. 

It was so named because of the length of the stream that flows through the area.

Geography
The waters of the Tasman Sea form the eastern boundary. Four Mile Creek (the watercourse) flows through from south-west to north-east.

Road infrastructure 
Route A3 (Tasman Highway) passes through from south-east to north-east.

References

Towns in Tasmania
Localities of Break O'Day Council